Polygodial is chemical compound found in dorrigo pepper, mountain pepper, horopito, canelo, paracress, water-pepper, and Dendrodoris limbata.

Chemically it is a drimane-type sesquiterpene dialdehyde of formula C15H22O2.

It elicits a warm and pungent flavour.

The in vitro biological activity of polygodial has been reported in the scientific literature to include antifungal and antimicrobial activities, antihyperalgesia,  potent attachment-inhibitory activity,  insect antifeedant activity, antinociception, vasorelaxing action in vessels of rabbit and guinea pig, anti-inflammatory and antiallergic activities.

Polygodial’s primary antifungal action is as a nonionic surfactant, disrupting the lipid-protein interface of integral proteins nonspecifically, denaturing their functional conformation. It is also likely that polygodial permeates by passive diffusion across the plasma membrane, and once inside the cells may react with a variety of intracellular compounds.

It is also an insecticide with antifeedant properties, which causes insects to starve.

References 

Aldehydes
Pungent flavors
Sesquiterpenes